Seldon Technologies Limited (commonly referred to as Seldon) is a British technology company founded in 2014, and headquartered in London, England. It makes MLOps software for enterprise deployment of machine learning models, and is a primary maintainer and contributor to a number of popular open source repositories such as Seldon Core.

History 
Seldon was founded in 2014, and joined the Barclays Techstars Incubator in 2015 to develop tooling for AI, and as of 2020 has deployed more than 1 million machine learning models.  Seldon is a guest advisor to the UK's All-Party Parliamentary Group for Artificial Intelligence.

The primary focus of the company is building cloud agnostic Machine Learning (ML) deployment tooling; and has worked in partnership Google, Red Hat, IBM and Amazon Web Services.

In 2019 they raised a €3 million seed funding round led by Amadeus Capital Partners, along with Global Brain Corporation, Techstars, and other existing investors.

Raised a £7.1M Series A co-led by AlbionVC and Cambridge Innovation Capital in November 2020.

Announced a Series B funding round resulting in an investment of $20M led by Bright Pixel with significant contribution from existing investors

Products 

 Core is a popular open-source MLOps framework used to package, deploy, monitor and manage production machine learning models.
 KFServing, an alternative MLOPs framework created as part of the Kubeflow project by Google, Seldon, IBM, Bloomberg and Microsoft.
 Alibi is an open-source Python library for machine learning model explainability, in 2020, Alibi earned Seldon a CogX Best Innovation in Explainable AI award.
Seldon Deploy, a closed-source software suite to deploy, manage, monitor and explain the outcomes of machine learning models.

References

External links 

 Seldon Core Repository
 Seldon Alibi Repository

British companies established in 2014
Companies based in London